The 2009-10 Texas Tech Red Raiders men's basketball team represented Texas Tech University in the 2009-10 NCAA Division I men's basketball season. The Red Raiders' were led by Pat Knight in his second full season as head coach. The team played its home games in the United Spirit Arena in Lubbock, Texas and are members of the Big 12 Conference. They finished the season 19–16, 4–12 in Big 12 play. They advanced to the quarterfinals of the 2010 Big 12 men's basketball tournament before falling to #1 Kansas. They were invited to the 2010 National Invitation Tournament where they advanced to the quarterfinals before falling to Mississippi.

Recruiting

2009

|-
|}

Transfers

Schedule

|-
!colspan=9| Regular season

|-
!colspan=9| Phillips 66 Big 12 Championship

|-
!colspan=9| National Invitation Tournament

Rankings

See also
2010 NCAA Men's Division I Basketball Tournament
2010 Big 12 men's basketball tournament
2009-10 NCAA Division I men's basketball season

References

Texas Tech Red Raiders basketball seasons
Texas Tech
Texas Tech
Texas Tech
Texas Tech